Rohan Kitshoff (born 13 September 1985) is a Namibian professional rugby union player, currently playing with Western Province Premier League club side Durbanville-Bellville. His regular position is flanker.

Career

He played youth rugby for  before joining . He left them without making a first class appearance however and joined  in 2007, where he became a regular.

He was the joint top try scorer in the 2012 Vodacom Cup, scoring seven tries.

He joined French Top 14 team  for the 2012–13 Top 14 season, but returned to South Africa to play for  once again. A few weeks later, he was also included in the ' team against the  during the 2013 Super Rugby season.

Durbanville-Bellville

In 2015, he joined Western Province club side Durbanville-Bellville and was a member of the squad that won the 2015 SARU Community Cup competition, scoring four tries in six appearances in the competition.

International

He made his international debut in 2010.

References

External links
 

1985 births
Living people
Expatriate rugby union players in France
Griquas (rugby union) players
Namibia international rugby union players
Namibian expatriate rugby union players
Namibian rugby union players
Rugby union flankers
Rugby union players from Windhoek
Stormers players
Union Bordeaux Bègles players
Welwitschias players
Western Province (rugby union) players
White Namibian people